In geometry, an arbelos is a plane region bounded by three semicircles with three apexes such that each corner of each semicircle is shared with one of the others (connected), all on the same side of a straight line (the baseline) that contains their diameters.

The earliest known reference to this figure is in Archimedes's Book of Lemmas, where some of its mathematical properties are stated as Propositions 4 through 8. The word arbelos is Greek for 'shoemaker's knife'. The figure is closely related to the Pappus chain.

Properties

Area
The area of the arbelos is equal to the area of a circle with diameter .

Since the area of a circle is proportional to the square of the diameter (Euclid's Elements, Book XII, Proposition 2; we do not need to know that the constant of proportionality is ), the problem reduces to showing that . This proof approximates the ancient Greek argument; Harold P. Boas cites a paper of Roger B. Nelsen who implemented the idea as the following proof without words.

Rectangle
The quadrilateral  is actually a rectangle.
The quadrilateral  therefore has three right angles, so it is a rectangle. Q.E.D.

Tangents
Proof: Since  is a right angle,  equals  minus . However,  also equals  minus  (since  is a right angle). The sum of the angles in any quadrilateral is 2π, so in quadrilateral ,  must be a right angle. Q.E.D.

Archimedes' circles
The altitude  divides the arbelos into two regions, each bounded by a semicircle, a straight line segment, and an arc of the outer semicircle.  The circles inscribed in each of these regions, known as the Archimedes' circles of the arbelos, have the same size.

Variations and generalisations 

The parbelos is a figure similar to the arbelos, that uses parabola segments instead of half circles. A generalisation comprising both arbelos and parbelos is the f-belos, which uses a certain type of similar differentiable functions.

In the Poincaré half-plane model of the hyperbolic plane, an arbelos models an ideal triangle.

Etymology

The name arbelos comes from Greek ἡ ἄρβηλος he árbēlos or ἄρβυλος árbylos, meaning "shoemaker's knife", a knife used by cobblers from antiquity to the current day, whose blade is said to resemble the geometric figure.

See also
 Archimedes' quadruplets
 Bankoff circle
 Schoch circles
 Schoch line
 Woo circles
 Pappus chain
 Salinon

References

Bibliography
 
 
  American Mathematical Monthly, 120 (2013), 929-935.

External links